is a Japanese actress.

Filmography

Films
  (1989)
   (1989)
 Heaven and Earth (1990)
 Best Guy (1990)
 
  (1991)
  (1993)
  (1994)
  (1995)
  (1997)
  (1998)
 Avalon (2001)
 Ouran High School Host Club (2012)
   (2013)
  (2016)
 Perfect World (2018)
 Kazoku no Hanashi (2018)
 Aiuta: My Promise to Nakuhito (2019)
 Iwane: Sword of Serenity (2019)
 Brave Father Online: Our Story of Final Fantasy XIV (2019)
 Silent Tokyo (2020)

Television
 Yoshitsune (2005), Hōjō Masako
 Carnation (2011)
 Naotora: The Lady Warlord (2017)
 Scarlet (2019–20)

Anime
 Human Crossing (2003)

Dubbing
 Avalon, Ash (Małgorzata Foremniak)

References

External links
 Official agency profile 
 
 

1966 births
Living people
Japanese actresses
People from Ōita (city)
Ken-On artists